Leon Barsha (December 26, 1905  November 13, 1964) was an American film producer, editor and director. As a producer and director he was best known for making films in the Western genre. In his later years he concentrated especially on editing.

Personal
Barsha was born in Manhattan, New York and died in California. He was married to Helen Barsha. They had a son, Tony, who became a playwright. Granddaughter Lili Barsha is an actor and writer.

The North Hollywood home of the Barshas was designed by the architect Richard Neutra in 1937. The house has been restored twice and moved at least once, changing owners several times.

Filmography

As producer
 The Taming of the West (1939)
 Prairie Schooners (1940)
 The Wildcat of Tucson (1940)
 Beyond the Sacramento (1940)
 Roaring Frontiers (1941)
 Hands Across the Rockies (1941)
 Bullets for Bandits (1942)

As editor
 Broadway Scandals (1929)
 Sudden Fear (1952)
 A Bullet for Joey (1955)
 Walk the Dark Street (1956)
 Lizzie (1957)
 Twilight Zone (TV Series, 11 episodes)  (1960-1961)
 Gunsmoke (an illustration of film editing) (1961)
 Lonely Are The Brave (1962)
 Lady in a Cage (1964)
 Rawhide (TV Series, 5 episodes)  (1964)

As director
 Murder is News (1937)
 Two-Fisted Sheriff (1937)
 Trapped (1937)
 Two Gun Law (1937)
 One Man Justice (1937)
 Convicted (1938)
 Special Inspector (1938)
 Who Killed Gail Preston? (1938)
 Manhattan Shakedown (1939)
 The Pace That Thrills (1952)

References

External links

1905 births
1964 deaths
Film producers from New York (state)
American film editors
People from Manhattan
People from North Hollywood, Los Angeles
Film producers from California
Film directors from New York City
Film directors from Los Angeles